Arnaud Nathanaël Luzayadio Nkodi, known as Arnaud Luzayadio (born 19 July 1999) is a French professional footballer who plays as a right-back for Eredivisie club Emmen.

Career
Luzayadio joined US Orléans from the Paris Saint-Germain Academy on a three-year deal on 21 June 2019, a few days after signing a professional contract with the Paris club. The deal was part of a development partnership being established between the two clubs. He made his professional debut for Orléans in a 1–0 Ligue 2 loss to FC Chambly on 2 August 2019.

On 26 July 2021, he signed a one-year contract with Dutch club Emmen.

Personal life
Born in France, Luzayadio is of Congolese descent.

Honours
Emmen
Eerste Divisie: 2021–22

References

External links
 
 

1999 births
Living people
Sportspeople from Montreuil, Seine-Saint-Denis
Association football fullbacks
French footballers
French sportspeople of Democratic Republic of the Congo descent
US Orléans players
FC Emmen players
Ligue 2 players
Championnat National players
Championnat National 2 players
Eerste Divisie players
French expatriate footballers
Expatriate footballers in the Netherlands
French expatriate sportspeople in the Netherlands
Footballers from Seine-Saint-Denis
Black French sportspeople